Bholavali is a small village in Mandangad, Ratnagiri district, Maharashtra state in Western India. The 2011 Census of India recorded a total of 823 residents in the village. Post Office: Latwan. Nearest Railway station: Karanjadi railway station.
Places to visit: 
1. BHOLAVALI'S dam 
2. Devacha Dongar
3. Kalbacha Deul (Temple)

Cluster(Wadi)
1. Khalcha Kond
2. Katal Wadi
3. Faujdar Kond
4. Bouddha Wadi
5. Rane Wadi(फड)
6. Devul Kond
7. Gaval Waddi
8. Bhend wadi  
9. Mane wadi 
10.Varcha kond

References

Villages in Ratnagiri district